Adrian (Andrian) Ivanovich Nepenin was an Imperial Russian naval officer and activist.  As the commander of the Baltic Fleet, he was credited with forming the naval intelligence and communication services in the fleet. He was most notable for his action in Finland during the February Revolution.

Honours and awards

Domestic
  Order of St. Stanislaus, 3rd class (9.4.1900)
  Order of St. Anna, 3rd class with swords and a bow (28.12.1900)
  Order of St. Vladimir, 4th class with swords and a bow (11.10.1904)
  Order of St. George, 1st class (3.9.1905)
  Order of St. Stanislaus, 1st class (19.1.1915) 
  Order of St. Anna, 1st class with swords (14.3.1916)

Foreign
 :
 Order of the Noble Bukhara (ru), 2nd class with silver star (1893)
 :
  Order of the Sacred Treasure, 4th class (1902)

Sources
 Nepenin, Adrian Ivanovich
 Nepenin, Adrian Ivanovich. The generals of the First World War

Imperial Russian Navy admirals
Recipients of the Order of St. Vladimir, 4th class
Recipients of the Order of St. Anna, 1st class
Recipients of the Order of Saint Stanislaus (Russian)
Russian military personnel of World War I
Russian murder victims
1917 deaths
1871 births
People from Velikiye Luki
Recipients of the Order of St. Anna, 3rd class
Russian nobility
Russian military personnel of the Russo-Japanese War